Gohar-e-Nayab() is a Pakistani drama serial aired on A-Plus Entertainment. Written by Samra Bukhari and directed by Sakina Samo the serial was produced by Abdullah Kadwani and Asad Qureshi under the banner 7th Sky Entertainment. The drama serial follows the story of a young, full of life and vibrant girl, Gohar a.k.a. Gori who is mistreated in her maternal home. However, nothing hampers the exceptional spirit of her whose dreams of a fairy tale wedding and a happily ever after remain undeterred.

It stars Sajal Ali and Ahsan Khan in lead roles in their third on-screen appearances after Meray Qatil Meray Dildar and Meri Ladli.

Cast
 Sajal Aly as Gohar a.k.a. Gori
 Ahsan Khan as Sami
 Zaheen Tahira as Sonya's grandmother
 Mohsin Gillani as Wahab
 Azra Mohyeddin as Azra
 Afshan Qureshi as Gohar's grandmother
 Humaira Bano as Nighat
 Madiha Rizvi as Rumi
 Shameen Khan as Tania
 Ayesha Gul as Sajida
 Rashid Farooqui as Iqbal 
 Esha Noor as Sonia
 Taqi Ahmed as Kamran
 Sarah Khan as Sara 
 Umer Naru  as Haseeb
 Asma Abbas as Fakhra
 Omer Naru as Haseeb
 Nighat Sultana
 Hanzala Shahid (child artist)
 Imran Ashraf (Tania's ex boyfriend, guest appearance)

Soundtrack 
The official soundtrack of the serial was composed by Owais Maqsood, the lyrics were penned by S. K. Khalish while performed by Indian playback singer, K. S. Chithra.

International broadcast 
The show was rebroadcast in Pakistan on ATV (Pakistan) by the title Gori.

In India, the show was broadcast on Zindagi from 17 December 2014 to 10 January 2015, under the title Gauhar.
In UK, the show was premiered on Zee TV UK in March 2014.
The show was also aired on Zee Salaam by the same title premiering 26 September 2016.

Accolades

Nominations 
 4th Pakistan Media Awards - Best Drama Writer - Samra Bukhari
 4th Pakistan Media Awards - Best Drama Actress - Sajal Aly

References 

2013 Pakistani television series debuts
Pakistani drama television series
Pakistani romance television series
2013 Pakistani television series endings
Urdu-language telenovelas
Pakistani telenovelas
A-Plus TV original programming
Zee Zindagi original programming